Tripp is a given name, as well as a nickname commonly used for males who are third-generation namesakes  Notable people with the name include:

Tripp Cromer (Roy Bunyan Cromer III, born 1967), American baseball player
 Tripp Eisen (Tod Rex Salvador, born 1965), American musician
Tripp Gibson (Hal Harrison Gibson III, born 1981), American Major League Baseball umpire
 Tripp Isenhour (John Henry Isenhour III, born 1968), American golfer
Tripp Merritt (Guy William Merritt III, born 1968), American football coach
Tripp Phillips (Owen Thomas Phillips III, born 1977), American tennis player
Tripp Schwenk (William Douglas Schwenk III, born 1971), American swimmer
Tripp Self (Tilman Eugene Self III, born 1968), United States District Judge
Tripp Sigman (Wesley Triplett Sigman, 1899–1971), American Major League Baseball player
Tripp Tracy (Emmet E. Tracy III, born 1973), American ice hockey goaltender
 Derrick Tribbett (Derrick "Tripp" Tribbett, born 1984), American musician
Tripp Welborne (Sullivan Anthony Welborne III, born 1968), American football player
Tripp York (Fred York), American religious studies scholar

References